Arroyo Fountain is a historical landmark in Iloilo City, Philippines. It is located in front of Casa Real de Iloilo, or the Old Iloilo Provincial Capitol, in Iloilo City Proper. It was named after Senator José María Arroyo, who authored the law, Republic Act No. 3222, that established the then Iloilo Metropolitan Waterworks in 1925.

The fountain stands as "Kilometre Zero", the benchmark used to measure distances from Iloilo City to other points in Panay Island, the Western Visayas region, and other places in the Philippines.

History 

Arroyo Fountain was built in 1927 after a law that established the Iloilo Metropolitan Waterworks in September 16, 1925. The site of the structure was where the original flagpole of the old Provincial Capitol used to stand.

The fountain is a sculpture composed of originally four naked Grecian icon muses holding overhead a large basin that is overflowing with water gushing from a spout at the top and flowing down to gather in a larger collective basin. However, in 1929, at the insistence of the Roman Catholic Church, the naked muses were later "clothed" in flowing garments and underwent re-sculpting to appear as what the statues look like today.

In modern times, the fountain still stands in the middle of the road, serving as a roundabout for vehicles coming to and from the different districts of the city.

References 

Buildings and structures in Iloilo City
Tourist attractions in Iloilo City